Mary O'Neill (born February 11, 1965) is an American fencer. She graduated from University of Pennsylvania and Harvard Medical School. She competed in the women's individual and team foil events at the 1988 and 1992 Summer Olympics and won a gold medal at the 1987 Pan American Games in the team foil event.

References

External links
 

1965 births
Living people
American female foil fencers
Olympic fencers of the United States
Fencers at the 1988 Summer Olympics
Fencers at the 1992 Summer Olympics
People from Concord, Massachusetts
Pan American Games medalists in fencing
Pan American Games gold medalists for the United States
University of Pennsylvania alumni
Harvard Medical School alumni
Fencers at the 1987 Pan American Games
Medalists at the 1987 Pan American Games
Sportspeople from Middlesex County, Massachusetts